Philip Day may refer to:

Philip Day (businessman) (born 1965), billionaire and CEO of Edinburgh Woollen Mill
Philip J Day, British documentary film director
Philip R. Day (born 1945), former Chancellor of City College of San Francisco
Phil Day (town planner) (1924–2011), Australian town planner and politician
Phil Day (artist) (born 1973), Australian artist